Ion Ioniţă may refer to:

 Ion Ioniță (ice hockey) (born 1951), Romanian ice hockey player
 Ion Ioniță (cyclist) (born 1928), Romanian cyclist